Honor Oak is an inner suburban area principally of the London Borough of Lewisham, with part in the London Borough of Southwark. It is named after the oak tree on One Tree Hill that Elizabeth I is reputed to have picnicked under.

Overview
One Tree Hill is the central feature of Honor Oak's landscape. It is at the northern end of a string of hills stretching from Croydon, previously part of the Great North Wood. A legend tells that on 1 May 1602, Elizabeth I picnicked with Sir Richard Bulkeley of Beaumaris in the Lewisham area by an oak tree at the summit of a hill. The tree came to be known as the Oak of Honor. The tree surrounded by railings is an oak, and was planted in 1905 as a successor to the historic one. In addition to its connection with Queen Elizabeth I, the hill is reputed by a long-standing rumour to have been the site of the final defeat of Queen Boudica by the Romans in AD61, while Dick Turpin is also rumoured to have used it as a look-out post.

A new development of exclusive houses was started in the 1780s on what is now Honor Oak Road.  This gave rise to both Honor Oak and Forest Hill, London communities.  These localities have drifted about a mile apart North and South respectively since, aided by the arrival of a canal and then railways.

Between 1809 and 1836, a canal ran through Honor Oak as part of its route from New Cross to Croydon. It also went via Forest Hill and Sydenham. The canal was replaced by a railway line after 1836, and this now forms part of the line between London Bridge and Croydon. Honor Oak Park railway station opened in 1886 on this line. Honor Oak railway station was opened in 1862 but closed in 1958 as part of the closure of the Crystal Palace and South London Junction Railway, originally built to take passengers to The Crystal Palace. The remains of the embankment of this line can still be seen, forming part of Brenchley Gardens.

The beacon at the summit of One Tree Hill was erected to commemorate the Silver Jubilee of King George VI in 1935. It was subsequently used for the Coronation of Queen Elizabeth II, her silver and golden jubilees and also at the Millennium. Beacons on the same site were used to give warning of invasion by the Spanish and later the French. The Hill was also the site of Watson's General Telegraph, a relay system established in 1841 linking London with shipping in the English Channel 

Honor Oak & Forest Hill Golf Club (now defunct) was founded in 1893. The club disappeared at the time of WW2.  This area is now Camberwell New Cemetery.

In 1896, One Tree Hill was due to become part of a golf club, but there were riots and demonstrations by local people. This fell through, and later it was bought by Metropolitan Borough of Camberwell and made into a public open space by 1905.

During World War I a gun emplacement was erected on the hill to counter the threat of raids by Zeppelin airships.

One part of the open space eventually became a nine-hole golf course called the Aquarius Golf Club. It lies on top of the cavernous Honor Oak Reservoir, constructed between 1901 and 1909. When it was completed the reservoir was the largest brick built underground reservoir in the world and even today remains one of the largest in Europe. The reservoir now forms part of the Southern extension of the Thames Water Ring Main.

The southern road bridge, which crosses the railway by the station, has relief sculpture parapets which were one of the first commissions for William Mitchell.

In 2010 Honor Oak Park railway station became part of the London Overground extension, providing residents with direct links into Shoreditch and Highbury and Islington. As with neighbouring Forest Hill, Honor Oak is becoming increasingly desirable as a peaceful, leafy suburb with good transport links into the centre of town, and slightly lower-than-average property prices.

Amenities and entertainment
Honor Oak enjoys a number of well regarded restaurants and gastro pubs. The Babur Indian Restaurant has two AA Rosettes and has been described as "one of the best Indian restaurants in London" by The Independent newspaper.  The high street has two cafes, one of which is Two Spoons, a cafe during the day and cocktail bar by night serves drinks inspired by the rich history of the local area.  The area has a highly rated Italian restaurant, Le Querce (translation from the Italian "The Oaks"), Donde, a Spanish Tapas restaurant, an art gallery and a sourdough Pizza Restaurant called Mamma Dough that opened in February 2014. The Honor Oak is the reincarnation of the old St Germans public house. The Chandos, previously a more traditional south London pub, has recently been renovated and reopened in July 2016 as a craft-beer led pub, which also serves pizza and antipasti.

Notable residents
Sir John Cowan (1774-1842), chandler and Lord Mayor of London (1837-8), lived on Honor Oak Road.  In the year of her accession 1837, Queen Victoria visited the City; he received a baronetcy in recognition of the hospitality she was shown.

Irish-born political activist Jim Connell (1852–1929), author of The Red Flag, lived at 22a Stondon Park (which is on the border of Crofton Park and Honor Oak) from 1915–1929. He wrote the anthem while on a train journey to his home in New Cross in December 1889.

Engineer and astronomer Edwin Clark (1814-1894) lived at Observatory House on the corner of Honor Oak Park and Honor Oak Road from 1857–1879. He is principally known for his hydraulic boat lifts. Robert Stephenson left him money in his will which he used to build a telescope on his house.  Only the gates survive now.

Actor William Henry Pratt (1887–1969), better known as Boris Karloff, was born at 36 Forest Hill Road.

Poet Walter de la Mare lived at what is now 61 Bovill Road from 1877-c.1887.

Leslie Paul (1905–1985), founder of the Woodcraft Folk and author of Angry Young Man, lived on Bovill Road.

Footballer Ian Wright grew up in the area, including on the Honor Oak Estate. Well known Journalist Thomas Roles is reported to be moving to the area later this year.

The comedian Spike Milligan (1918–2002) lived at 22 Gabriel Street and 50 Riseldine Road after coming to England from India in the 1930s.

Desmond Dekker (1941–2006) lived at flat 4, Dunoon Gardens, Devonshire Road in the 1980s and 1990s.

Other famous residents have included include actor Timothy Spall and singer Gabrielle.

Nearest places

Further reading
The story of the "One Tree Hill" agitation, with a short sketch of the history of Honor Oak Hill (1905) by John Nisbet

References and notes

External links
 Honor Oak Park Railway Station
 Friends of Honor Oak
 St Augustine, One Tree Hill
 Walter Segal Self Build Trust
 The Honor Oak, Public House
 One Tree Hill Allotments
 Aquarius Golf Club

 
Forests and woodlands of London
Districts of the London Borough of Lewisham
Districts of the London Borough of Southwark
Areas of London